Nazih is both a given name and a surname. It is an Arabic origin word, (Arabic: نزيه). Notable people with the name include:

Given name
 Nazih Abu Afach (born 1946), Syrian poet and painter
 Nazih Ayubi (1943–1995), Egyptian writer
 Nazih Deif (1923–1992), Egyptian economist
 Nazih Elasmar (born 1953), Australian politician
 Nazih Geagea (born 1941), Lebanese alpine skier
 Nazih Kawakibi (1946–2009), Syrian architect

Surname
 Amjhad Nazih (born 2002), French football player
 Hasan Nazih (1921–2012), Iranian jurist and politician
 Hesham Nazih (born 1972), Egyptian composer
 Imran Nazih (born 2006), Dutch football player of Moroccan origin 

Arabic masculine given names
Arabic-language surnames